Fidjemoen is a neighbourhood in the city of Kristiansand in Agder county, Norway. It is located in the borough of Grim and in the district of Hellemyr.  It is located on the north side of the European route E39 highway.  It lies at the western side of the district, west of Vestheiene and south of Solkollen.

Transportation

References

Geography of Kristiansand
Neighbourhoods of Kristiansand